James Ogilvie-Grant, 11th Earl of Seafield, DL (18 April 1876 – 12 November 1915), briefly known as Viscount Reidhaven in 1888, was a Scottish nobleman.

Seafield was born in 1876 in Oamaru, New Zealand. He was the eldest child of Francis William Ogilvy-Grant, 10th Earl of Seafield, and Ann Nina, daughter of Major George Thomas Evans, of County Limerick and of Clooneavin, New Zealand. He had six siblings; four sisters and two brothers. His youngest brother was Trevor Ogilvie-Grant (1879–1948). His youngest sister, Nina Geraldine (1884–1951), married Sir Lees Knowles, 1st Baronet in 1915.

He started his education at Warwick House preparatory school in Christchurch (which his younger brother Trevor also attended). He then attended Christ's College and Lincoln College. He succeeded in the earldom and other titles and as 30th Chief of Clan Grant on his father's death in 1888.

Lord Seafield lived in Auckland before his marriage to Mary Elizabeth Nina Townend, the eldest daughter of Dr Joseph Henry Townend, of Christchurch, New Zealand, in 1898. They had one daughter.

Lord Seafield served as a Justice of the Peace for Banffshire, Morayshire, and Inverness-shire. He was commissioned a second lieutenant in the 3rd (Militia) Battalion, the Bedfordshire Regiment, on 21 June 1902. He fought in World War I as a captain in the 3rd Queen's Own Cameron Highlanders, and was attached to the 5th Battalion Cameron Highlanders. He was a Deputy Lieutenant for the County of Elgin.

He was supposed to be on leave from action in World War I, but his leave got cancelled and he died on 12 November 1915, aged 39, from wounds received at Flanders in Belgium. He is buried at Lijssenthoek Military Cemetery. Lord Seafield was succeeded in the barony of Strathspey, the baronetcy of Colquhoun and as Chief of Clan Grant by his younger brother Hon. Trevor Ogilvie-Grant. The earldom and the other subsidiary Scottish peerages could be passed on to female heirs, and were inherited by his daughter Nina Caroline Studley-Herbert.

References

1876 births
1915 deaths
Earls of Seafield
Deputy Lieutenants of Elginshire
Deputy Lieutenants of Banffshire
British military personnel killed in World War I
People educated at Christ's College, Christchurch
Lincoln University (New Zealand) alumni
Grant, James Ogilvie-Grant, 10th Lord
People from Oamaru
British Army personnel of World War I
Bedfordshire and Hertfordshire Regiment officers
Queen's Own Cameron Highlanders officers
Burials at Lijssenthoek Military Cemetery